The 2019 UEFA European Under-21 Championship Final was a football match that took place on 30 June 2019 at the Dacia Arena in Udine, Italy, to determine the winners of the 2019 UEFA European Under-21 Championship. The match was contested by Spain and Germany, the defending champions of the competition, making the fixture a rematch of the previous final.

Spain won the final 2–1 for their fifth UEFA European Under-21 Championship title, equalling Italy's record.

Route to the final

Match

Details

References

External links

Final
UEFA European Under-21 Championship finals
Spain national under-21 football team
2018–19 in Spanish football
Germany national under-21 football team
2018–19 in German football
Sport in Udine
June 2019 sports events in Italy